James Dougherty or Jim Dougherty may refer to: 

Jim Dougherty (baseball) (born 1968), Major League Baseball pitcher
Jim Dougherty (footballer) (1878–1944), English footballer
James Dougherty (Medal of Honor) (1839–1897),  U.S. Marine and Medal of Honor recipient
Sir James Dougherty (civil servant) (1844–1934), Member of Parliament for Londonderry City, 1914–1918
James Dougherty (police officer) (1921–2005), first husband of Marilyn Monroe
Jimmie Dougherty (born 1978), American football coach and former player

See also
James Doherty (disambiguation)
James Daugherty (1889–1974), American modernist painter